Thouaré-sur-Loire (literally Thouaré on Loire) is a commune in the Loire-Atlantique department in western France.

Origin of the name
The origins of Thouaré are not certain.  According to certain hypotheses, the foundation of the city was due to a Roman legionnaire by the name of Taurus or Tauraicus, who had been given a rich villa in the area.  Another is that it is due to a Celtic god, worshipped in this part of Gaul, by the name of Taur.  

The name of Thouaré appears for the first time in the chart of Louis the Fat in 1123. Its orthography differs due to successive editors: Thoaré, Thoyré, Touaré, Thoaret, Thoairé, then finally Thouaré.

Population

See also
Communes of the Loire-Atlantique department

References

Thouaresurloire